An LVDT (Linear Variable Differential Transformer) Variable Area Rotameter, is a meter designed to measure the flow rate of a fluid or gas.

The flow meter utilizes a unique combination of a tapered metering cone in series with a piston. The position of the metal piston is sensed by the LVDT circuitry and is then translated into a flow rate. This non linear signal can be directly displayed or linearized with an electrical output.

Advantages include the ability to externally measure very low flow rates.

References 

Flow meters